Eekhout is a Dutch surname. Notable people with the surname include:

Blanca Eekhout (born 1968), Venezuelan politician
Jan Eekhout (1900–1978), Dutch writer, poet and translator

See also
Greg van Eekhout, American writer
Eekhout Abbey, a medieval house of Augustinian Canons in Bruges, West Flanders, Belgium

Dutch-language surnames